G. longicauda may refer to:

Glyptothorax longicauda
Gobius longicauda